Andreyevskaya is a rural locality (a village) in Bogorodskoye Rural Settlement, Ust-Kubinsky District, Vologda Oblast, Russia. The population was 7 as of 2002.

Geography 
The distance to Ustye is 73 km, to Bogorodskoye is 13 km. Kuznecheyevskaya is the nearest rural locality.

References 

Rural localities in Ust-Kubinsky District